The 2017 NCAA Rifle Championships took place from March 9 to March 11 in Columbus, Ohio at the St. John Arena, particularly at the French Field House. The tournament went into its 38th consecutive NCAA Rifle Championships, and featured eight teams across all divisions.

Team results

 Note: Top 8 only
 (H): Team from hosting U.S. state

Individual results

 Note: Table does not include consolation
 (H): Individual from hosting U.S. State

References

2017 in American sports
2017 in sports in Ohio
NCAA Rifle Championship
NCAA